Donald Duckworth is a retired NASCAR Grand National Series driver from Gray Court, South Carolina, US.

Career
Duckworth made his sole Cup Series appearance at the 1955 Southern 500 under the Woodruff Motors sponsorship livery while driving a 1955 Chevrolet.

In the 1955 Southern 500, Duckworth qualified 40th and finished 55th after Arden Mounts crashed into his stalled vehicle on lap 147. While Bill Champion managed to avoid Duckworth by swerving past the vehicle rapidly, Mounts did not see the stalled vehicle it was until too late to avoid him. Duckworth earned $50 ($ when adjusted for inflation).

Despite his very brief career, his appearance on filmed media makes him one of the more recognizable drivers who never made it in professional stock car racing.

References

Living people
NASCAR drivers
People from Gray Court, South Carolina
Year of birth missing (living people)
Racing drivers from South Carolina